Baaghi is a series of Indian Hindi-language action thriller films. All films are produced by Sajid Nadiadwala under the banner of Nadiadwala Grandson Entertainment while the first film is distributed by UTV Motion Pictures and the second and third are by Fox Star Studios. The first film Baaghi was released in 2016 and directed by Sabbir Khan and the second and third films Baaghi 2 (2018) and Baaghi 3 (2020) are directed by Ahmed Khan. Baaghi 2 till date is the most successful film in the franchise grossing over  worldwide.

Overview

Baaghi

Ronny, a rebellious and a strong martial artist faces his biggest battle when he has to travel to Thailand, to rescue the love of his life from a dreaded martial arts world champion who is also his biggest enemy.

Baaghi 2

A Battle-Hardened and an Rebellious Indian Army Officer goes in search of his ex-girlfriends Child who is mysteriously kidnapped. Neha reaches out to the only person who can help her with her plight Ronnie. He goes deep into the underbelly of Goa, facing off aganist drug lords, menacing Russian henchmen, and blood-thirsty animals. Daring Stunts, chase sequences, air strikes, bomb blasts, and other large scale action sequences will be done with a bona-fide, larger than life approach, truly making it a spectacle. The Rebel For Love gets ready to fight.

Baaghi 3

Ronnie, a young man, shares a deep bond with Vikram, his elder brother and a policeman. When Vikram gets kidnapped in Syria while on a mission, Ronnie sets out to rescue him taking on an entire country.

Films

Baaghi

It is the Hindi remake of the Telugu film Varsham, with a climax inspired by the 2011 Indonesian film The Raid: Redemption. It stars Tiger Shroff and Shraddha Kapoor in the lead roles and Sudheer Babu in his Hindi debut, with Sunil Grover in a supporting role. Baaghi was released worldwide on 29 April 2016.

Baaghi 2

Based on the Telugu film Kshanam, and serving as the second installment in this series. It stars Tiger Shroff as the titular protagonist with Disha Patani in the lead role. Baaghi 2 was released worldwide on 30 March 2018 including 3500 screens in India. Although the action sequences and the cast performances received praise, the film was criticized for its inconsistent script and direction. The film grossed over  worldwide to become the third highest-grossing Bollywood film of 2018.

Baaghi 3

A sequel, Baaghi 3, was commissioned after the success of the previous film and was also directed by Ahmed Khan, with both Tiger and Shraddha reprising their roles and Sunit Morarjee in a cameo role. The core plot of the film is based on the  2012 Tamil film Vettai. The film co-stars Jaideep Ahlawat, Vijay Varma, Jameel Khoury and Disha Patani, who played the female lead in the previous film, makes a special appearance in the song "Do You Love Me". The action sequences were choreographed by Ram Chella, Lakshman Chella, and Kecha Khampadkee.Baaghi 3 was theatrically released in India on 6 March 2020. The film's collections were affected by the COVID-19 pandemic as the theatres were shut down. There were plans for a re-release once the outbreak would end, but the makers instead decided to release it on digital platforms. The film became the second highest grossing bollywood film of 2020.

Baaghi 4 (2024)
The fourth installment is currently in development. Ahmed Khan said: "The owner of the film is Sajid Nadiadwala. If he decides that we should go ahead with Baaghi 4, we will do it. But we will keep the franchise alive definitely". While interacting with Bollywood Hungama, Tiger Shroff said: "You know I have gotten so many messages and so many calls from people who've said they have unfortunately missed Baaghi 3, because of the situation in the world. They were really etching to see but could not, because of all that was happening. So, the only thing on my mind right now is Baaghi 3, and as you said, I hope they re-release the film. If not, then Baaghi 4 is definitely on the cards".

Recurring cast and characters 
This table lists the main characters who appear in the Baaghi Franchise.
A dark grey cell indicates the character was not in the film.

Additional crew and production details

Release and revenue

References

External links
 
 
 

 
2010s Hindi-language films
2020s Hindi-language films
Indian sequel films
2010s masala films
2020s masala films
Kalarippayattu films
Hindi remakes of Telugu films
Hindi remakes of Tamil films
Indian action thriller films
Films about kidnapping in India
Indian martial arts films
Indian films about revenge
Fox Star Studios films

See also
 Cop Universe
 Dhoom (franchise)
 Tiger (franchise)
 Race (film series)
 YRF Spy Universe
 Dinesh Vijan's horror-comedy universe
 K.G.F (film series)
 Lokesh Cinematic Universe